Ro-44 may refer to:

IMAM Ro.44, an Italian fighter seaplane of 1936
, an Imperial Japanese Navy submarine commissioned in 1943 and sunk in 1944